Barefoot Sound is an American manufacturer of pro audio loudspeakers. Barefoot Sound LLC was founded by Thomas Barefoot and Tedi Sarafian who began manufacturing studio monitors in 2006 in San Francisco, California, United States.

See also 
List of studio monitor manufacturers

References

External links
 Barefoot Sound official website (English)

Loudspeaker manufacturers
Audio equipment manufacturers of the United States